The Sun was an Australian afternoon tabloid newspaper, first published under that name in 1910.

History
The Sunday Sun was first published on 5 April 1903.

In 1910 Hugh Denison founded Sun Newspaper Ltd and took over publication of the old and ailing and Australian Star and its sister Sunday Sun, appointing Monty Grover as editor-in-chief. The Star became The Sun, and the Sunday Sun became The Sun: Sunday edition on 11 December 1910. According to its claim, below the masthead of that issue, it had a "circulation larger than that of any other Sunday paper in Australia".

Denison sold the business in 1925.

In 1953, The Sun was acquired from Associated Newspapers by Fairfax Holdings in Sydney, Australia, as the afternoon companion to The Sydney Morning Herald. At the same time, the former Sunday edition, the Sunday Sun, was discontinued and merged with the Sunday Herald into the tabloid Sun-Herald. 

Publication of The Sun ceased on 14 March 1988. Some of its content, and sponsorship of the Sydney City to Surf footrace, was continued in   The Sun-Herald.

Digitisation 
Some issues of the paper have been digitised as part of the Australian Newspapers Digitisation Program of the National Library of Australia.

See also 
 GIO Building
 List of newspapers in Australia
 List of newspapers in New South Wales

References

External links 
 
 The Sunday Sun (Sydney, NSW : 1903 - 1910) at Trove
 The Sun : Sunday Edition (Sydney, NSW : 1910) at Trove

Defunct daily newspapers
Defunct newspapers published in Sydney
Newspapers established in 1910
Daily newspapers published in Australia